The Francis M. Kirkham House is a historic building located in Des Moines, Iowa, United States.   It is a two-story dwelling that follows an irregular plan. It features a hipped roof with gablets, decorative wood shingles in the gable end, bargeboards, reeded panels that form the cornice, a gabled bay placed at an angle, bracketed eaves, and decorative window surrounds. The property on which it stands is a part of one of ten plats that were owned by Drake University. The University sold the lot to Francis M. Kirkham in 1886, and he had the house built by 1888 and resided in it.  Kirkham was a Disciples of Christ minister and editor of the Christian Oracle.  He was also one of the first trustees of Drake University.  Its significance is attributed to the effect of the University's innovative financing techniques upon the settlement of the area around the campus.  The house was listed on the National Register of Historic Places in 1988.

References 

Houses completed in 1888
Victorian architecture in Iowa
Houses in Des Moines, Iowa
National Register of Historic Places in Des Moines, Iowa
Houses on the National Register of Historic Places in Iowa